Dal Khalsa is a Sikh organisation, based in the city of Amritsar. The organisation was formed in 1978 and came to prominence under the inspiration and time of Jarnail Singh Bhindranwale in 1981. The primary aim of Dal Khalsa is to achieve the independence of the Punjabi-speaking Sikh majority region of North West India through peaceful and democratic means in order to establish a sovereign Sikh state, Khalistan.

Aims and objectives
Dal Khalsa state their aims and objectives as follows:
 To provide principled direction to Sikh politics, while campaigning for a sovereign Sikh Republic or State of Khalistan and exposing the 1984 Sikh Genocide.
 To promote respect, observance and commitment for human rights as enshrined in the Sikh faith as well in various international arrangements.
 To ensure that South Asia is a nuclear-free zone.
 To strengthen the economy of the Punjab through active association with world economy and to nurture and develop the Sikh Diaspora worldwide.
 To revamp the education system in accordance with Sikh traditions and to cater to the needs of modern society.

History
There is a controversy on the foundation of Dal Khalsa. Noted journalist Mark Tully in his book claimed that Sanjay Gandhi and Giani Zail Singh were instrumental in its formation in order to promote Bhinderawale and to harass Akalis. Another version is that it was founded by Gurbachan Singh Manochahal on 6 August 1978, at a convention held at Gurdwara Akal-Garh, Sector 35, Chandigarh, with the objective of establishing an independent Sikh state outside the Union of India. A number of Sikh Youth organisations had participated in the convention to discuss affairs of the Sikh Panth. The formation of the Dal Khalsa occurred shortly after an infamous clash between Sikhs belonging to the Akhand Kirtani Jatha and the followers of a Sikh sect known as the Nirankaris (whom other Sikhs regard as heretics). This clash had occurred at a Nirankari event at the Harmandir Sahib in Amritsar on 13 April 1978, in which 3 Nirankaris and 13 Sikhs were killed.

At its first annual conference held in Gurdaspur during December, 1979, the Dal Khalsa passed a resolution demanding that Amritsar be officially declared a "holy city". A demand that was supported by other Sikh organisations such as the Sikh Students Federation and one which was later taken up with the Indian government by the SGPC in 1980. However, the Indian government made no decision on the demand to declare Amritsar a "holy city" which prompted the Dal Khalsa and the Sikh Students Federation to organise a procession on 31 May 1981. The Hindu community was opposed to the demand of declaring Amritsar a "holy city" and held their own parallel procession in Amritsar on 29 May 1981.

For the first time the flag of Khalistan was hoisted on 1 August 1980, by activists of the Dal Khalsa at the spot in Amritsar where 13 Sikhs had been killed during a clash with the Nirankaris on 13 April 1978. Shortly after activists of the Dal Khalsa again raised the flag of Khalistan at various places in the Punjab state during India's Independence day on 15 August 1980.

During 1981 the Dal Khalsa along with other Sikh organisations such as the Sikh Students Federation, SGPC and Shiromani Akali Dal demanded associate membership in the United Nations for the 'Sikh Nation'. Owing largely to the Dal Khalsa a resolution to this effect was passed at the "Sikh Educational Conference" held in Chandigarh on 15 March 1981, which had been organised by the Chief Khalsa Diwan. During this event American based Khalistan protagonist, Ganga Singh Dhillon, delivered a speech on why the Sikhs are a nation and slogans of "Khalistan Zindabad" (Long live Khalistan) were raised at the event.

Activity resulting in a temporary ban on Dal Khalsa

A 10-year ban was put on the Dal Khalsa by the Indian government in 1982 following militant activities carried out by the organization. These included several plane hijackings such as the 1981 hijacking of an Indian Airlines Jetliner (Boeing 737). The plane was hijacked on 29 September 1981, by five members of the Dal Khalsa as a form of protest against the arrest of Sant Jarnail Singh Bhindranwale who had been accused of being involved in the murder of Jalandhar based Hindu newspaper owner Jagat Narain later on Ranjit Singh confessed to murdered Jagat Narain. Ranjit Singh was from Akhand Kirtani Jatha and did not belong to Bhindranwale. The hijackers were under the leadership of Gajinder Singh who a few years later was nominated as Chairman of the organization while on asylum in Pakistan. The Dal Khalsa activists forced the plane to land in Lahore, Pakistan and demanded the release of Sant Jarnail Singh Bhindranwale in addition to demanding the release of all persons who had been detained in connection with the Khalistan movement, a ransom of 500,000 dollars and compensation of 100,000 Indian Rupees (Rs.) for the families of each Sikhs that had been killed on 20 September 1981, at Chowk Mehta after the arrest of Sant Jarnail Singh Bhindranwale. A day after the hijacking Pakistani commandos arrested the Dal Khalsa activists. The hijackers were identified as Gajinder Singh, Satnam Singh of Paonta Sahib, Jasbir Singh of Ropar, Tejinderpal Singh of Jalandhar and Karam Singh of Jammu. Though Sant Jarnail Singh Bhindranwale had never openly or officially associated with the Dal Khalsa the organization was largely seen have had close links with him.

In January 1982, Harsimran Singh, chief organizer of the Dal Khalsa was arrested from Mohali near Chandigarh. The Dal Khalsa leaders believed that his arrest was possible due to a conspiracy by some member of the organization. Harsimran Singh was allegedly tortured by the police and was told that they had the permission of the Government to kill him in a fake encounter near the Indo-Pakistan border. Harsimran Singh was forced to read out a written statement if he wanted to save his life.

The Dal Khalsa and National Council of Khalistan were banned by the Indian government in May, 1982 after which the Dal Khalsa went underground. Two years later, the Dal Khalsa announced its "Government in Exile" in June, 1984.

Gajinder Singh, one of the plane hijackers of the Indian Airlines Jetliner (Boeing 737) in 1981, accepted the post of Chairman of the Dal Khalsa in 1986.

Revival of Dal Khalsa
After remaining largely dormant and underground for over a decade the Dal Khalsa was revived in 1998 after the ban on the organisation had lapsed. The revived Dal Khalsa continues to commit to its original objective of establishing an independent Khalistan. The main office of the Dal Khalsa is presently based in Amritsar at "Freedom House", Sarhadi Complex, Railway Road. The Dal Khalsa has since also established units in the United States and the Dal Khalsa UK in addition to branches across the Punjab state, India. The revived Dal Khalsa has pledged to put aside armed resistance and further the cause of Khalistan by peaceful and democratic means.

On 30 September 2005, the co-founder of the Dal Khalsa, Gajinder Singh stepped down as Chairman of the organisation. Satnam Singh Paonta, himself one of the original Dal Khalsa founders, was chosen as the new President on 2 October (2005) at a convention held in Chandigarh. In addition to Satnam Singh Paonta being chosen as the new leader of the Dal Khalsa, the organization welcomed Jaspal Singh Dhillon, head of the Human Rights and Democracy Forum into the party fold as its new vice President.

The new senior leadership of the Dal Khalsa had pledged that it will continue to deploy peaceful methods to achieve an independent Khalistan but will also take up other socio-political issues faced by the people of Punjab such as education for rural children and tackling the menace of drug abuse. However, the primary objective of the Dal Khalsa would remain the same and that it will not divert from its original and main goal of establishing an independent and sovereign Khalistan.

In June 2005, the Dal Khalsa became a constituent member of the Punjab Rights Forum.

Currently H.S. Dhami is the president of Dal Khalsa, and Kanwarpal Singh is the secretary general. Mr Dhami, 58 who hails from Hoshiarpur is industrialist by profession. He did M.S.C in 1975 from DAV College, Jalandhar and it was the writings and revolutionary poetry of Gajinder Singh that inspired him to join the organization in 2003.

In May 2006 the Vice-President of the Dal Khalsa, Jaspal Singh Dhillon, paid a visit to London, UK where he had been invited to attend and deliver a speech on Self-determination for Khalistan at the inaugural launch and conference of a new lobby group called Parliamentarians for National Self-Determination (PNSD) which was held on 11 May at the British Parliament in Westminster. The Dal Khalsa has sought to work closely with Parliamentarians for National Self-Determination in which the Sikh Nation is one of the founder members.

Recent activity
In February 2007 the Dal Khalsa broke from its earlier stance regarding the Punjab state legislature by supporting two candidates in the Punjab polls, most notably SGPC member Karnail Singh Panjoli. During the Punjab legislative assembly elections the Dal Khalsa also supported candidates from the Shiromani Akali Dal (Amritsar) led by Simranjit Singh Mann.

In September, 2008, Dal Khalsa named the expatriate Sikh leader Manmohan Singh vice president.  Singh had already been placed on an Indian government blacklist for past militant activities.

On 3 November 2009, marking 25 years of the anti-Sikh massacre following the assassination of then PM Indira Gandhi, Dal Khalsa called for Punjab Bandh. In showing solidarity to the cause, the people of Punjab, regardless of their religion or race, observed complete shutdown in the state to protest against the denial of justice to the aggrieved Sikhs. The bandh was largely peaceful, and the shutdown call had a full backing of other factions like Delhi Sikh Gurdwara Management Committee, Shiromani Akali Dal (Panch Pardani), Sikh Youth of Punjab and various factions of Sikh Students Federation. In November 2009, Kanwarpal Singh and other noted Sikh representatives from various organizations, under the leadership of Justice (retd) Ajit Singh Bains met Ms Shalini Dewan, Director, United Nations Information Centre at New Delhi on 11 November 2009 and urged the UN to intervene in getting justice for victims of November 1984 anti-Sikh carnage. The meet was cordial and Ms Dewan assured the delegation that UN will certainly take up the matter with the Indian government so that justice is delivered to aggrieved Sikhs. She took exception on the killings of thousands of innocent Sikhs and expressed regret that justice has not been delivered even after 25 years.

On 26 January 2010, Dal Khalsa wrote a letter to Indian PM highlighting constitutional and legal discriminations faced by Sikhs in India. It demanded that Indian state should immediately abrogate Article 25 (2) (b) of the Indian constitution as it violates the fundamental recognition of Sikhs as a separate religion"

On 12 May 2010, to commemorate first rule established by Sikh leader Baba Banda Singh Bahadur, Dal Khalsa held a big Sikh parade in India starting from Chaparchiri to Fatehgarh Sahib where flag of Khalistan was unfurled and saluted and pictures of Sikh militants (who died fighting for Khalistan) were openly displayed. In 2015, Dal Khalsa demanded opening of Cow-Slaughterhouses in Punjab and also questioned Beef-Ban in Jammu and Kashmir.

In September 2015, Dal Khalsa and Shiromani Akali Dal (Panch Pardani) merged into a single entity by signing a Memorandum of Understanding (MoU) with the main aim to achieve a separate Sikh home land.

Nanakshahi calendar
On 14 March 2010 Dal Khalsa commemorated 227th anniversary of the historic event when Sikh warrior Baba Baghel Singh, unfurled Nishan Sahib atop the historic Red Fort in 1783. At a well-attended convention at a village gurdwara built in memory of Baba Baghel Singh, Dal Khalsa rejected the amended version of the SGPC Nanakshahi Calendar which went back to the original Sikh calendar with Bikrami dates (moon dates). They released the Nanakshahi calendar (Mool Nanakshahi Calendar) created by SGPC sponsored Sikh scholar Pal Singh Purewal. The calendar has been dedicated to the great Sikh warrior Baba Baghel Singh. 

Dal Khalsa spokesperson Kanwarpal Singh rued that the SGPC has killed the letter and spirit of Nanakshahi calendar by mixing it with Bikrami calendar, which had its roots in Hinduism. "We had mentioned dates of Gurpurabs [Sikh religious days] according to original calendar adopted in April 2003 as we believe that the amended version has an imprint of RSS ideology," Singh said.  "Dal Khalsa fully recognises the conspiracy behind this which is led by Hindutva Fanatics and the RSS.  In principle, we are totally against the changes as per Bikrami calendar made by the SGPC on the dictates of SAD (Badal) to appease Sant Samaj," he alleged. On 3 January 2010, SGPC executive members had given approval to bring amendments in Nanak Shahi Calendar, following the green signal from Akal Takht. However, several Sikh organisations have condemned the changes brought in the calendar.

Sit-in and hunger strike
In order to press upon the SGPC and SAD leadership to build memorial of June 1984 martyrs, Dal Khalsa party activists held 72 hours sit-in protest at outside the main entrance gate of Darbar Sahib Complex from 3 June to 6,2010.

A jatha of 100 activists led by party head H S Dhami began their silent protest outside the SGPC offices on 3 June at 11 AM. Addressing the media over there, party head urged Jathedar Avtar Singh Makkar to break the silence and take the lead as it was high time to lay the foundation stone of the memorial as the Sikh Nation is observing the 26th anniversary of Darbar Sahib on 6 June.

Stressing on the need to build memorial, he said by raising the memorial in memory of 'martyrs of the faith', the SGPC would not only deliver a sense of pride and fraternity to their families but also goads the Sikhs to relive those times. Also it will be a rebuttal to those, who have been trying to erase this period from public memory.

Activists mostly youngsters from Hoshiarpur, Ludhiana, Amritsar, Jalandhar, Nawanshahr and Moga participated in the sit-in to show their steadfastness towards the cause and also to pay homage to martyrs.

On the concluding day (6 June) of its 72 hours sit-in protest, the organization vowed to take the June 84 memorial issue to its logical conclusion. H S Dhami said it's a beginning of the struggle. Our aim was to pay tribute to the 'martyrs of faith' and bring the issue of memorial into limelight, which we had succeeded. He said the silence of Akali leadership about memorial to 1984 martyrs even after 26 years of the deadly attack was disgusting and disappointing.

Party's senior most leader Satnam Singh Paonta Sahib ended his 72 hours fast after performing Ardas at Akal Takht by eating karah parshad.

References

External links
Official site of the Dal Khalsa
Official site of the Dal Khalsa of America

Khalistan movement